Jamell Maurice Demons (born May 1, 1999), known professionally as YNW Melly (initialism for Young Nigga World Melly), is an American rapper and singer. He is best known for his songs "Murder on My Mind", "Mixed Personalities" (featuring Kanye West), "Suicidal" (featuring Juice Wrld), and "223's" (featuring 9lokkNine). The first is considered his breakout, which garnered him further attention after being charged with the double-murder of two fellow rappers in the "YNW" collective. In November 2019, he released his debut album, Melly vs. Melvin, peaking number 8 on the Billboard 200.

In February 2019, he was arrested and charged with two counts of premeditated first-degree murder and faces life imprisonment without the possibility of parole or the death penalty if convicted. He is also a suspect in the 2017 murder of a sheriff's deputy in Gifford. In March 2019, Demons pleaded not guilty to the double-murder charges and is currently awaiting trial.

Early life
Jamell Demons was born on May 1, 1999, and grew up in Gifford, Florida. He was raised by his single mother, Jamie Demons-King, and does not know who his father is.  Another rapper, Donte "Tha Gift" Taylor, claims to be YNW Melly's father. Demons-King was 14 years old when she became pregnant with him, giving birth to him in ninth grade. Later moving to a poorer part of Gifford, his mother struggled to pay for housing and basic necessities. Demons' younger brother YNW BSlime is also a rapper. 

Demons joined the Bloods gang at a young age. He started posting his songs on SoundCloud when he was 15. In late 2015, Demons was arrested for shooting at a group of students near Vero Beach High School. He was subsequently convicted of aggravated battery, discharging a firearm in public, and two counts of aggravated assault, for which he served several months in prison.

Career

2016–2018: Early fame, Collect Call EP, and I AM YOU 
Demons adopted the stage name "YNW Melly" in 2016. YNW (an initialism of "Young Nigga World" or "Young New Wave") is a hip-hop collective that included Demons, Anthony "YNW Sakchaser" Williams, Christopher "YNW Juvy" Thomas Jr., and Cortlen "YNW Bortlen" Henry.

In late 2017, while still incarcerated, Demons released his first project, an EP called Collect Call, which contained features from numerous well-known artists, including Lil B and John Wicks. In 2018, he released the singles "Virtual (Blue Balenciagas)", "Melly the Menace", and "Slang That Iron". Other singles include "4 Real", "Butter Pecan", and "Medium Fries". The respective music videos have amassed 26 million, 16 million and 11 million views on YouTube, as of January 2019.

In August 2018, Demons released his debut mixtape I Am You, which later appeared on the Billboard 200 at number 192 on January 10, 2019.

2019–2021: We All Shine, Melly vs. Melvin, and Just a Matter of Slime 
On January 18, 2019, while incarcerated, Demons released We All Shine, his second commercial mixtape, consisting of 16 tracks. The project featured collaborations with Kanye West and Fredo Bang. A music video directed by Cole Bennett with Lyrical Lemonade for "Mixed Personalities" featuring West was released with the album.

As of March 2019, Demons had amassed over 200 million streams on Spotify with over 10 million monthly listeners. His most-streamed song was "Murder on My Mind", which was originally released as a single before being added to I Am You.

On November 22, 2019, Demons released his debut studio album, Melly vs. Melvin. It peaked at number eight on the Billboard 200, making it his highest-charting album. The album included the singles "223's", which peaked at number 34 on the Billboard Hot 100.

On March 13, 2020, Demons released a remix of his track "Suicidal", making it the second single from Melly vs. Melvin. The remix included a feature from late American rapper and singer Juice Wrld, making it his third official posthumous feature. The song has peaked at number 20 on the Hot 100, becoming Melly's second top 20 entry.

After a year of not releasing music and still fighting his pending murder case, on March 5, 2021, Melly recruited fellow Florida artist Kodak Black for the release of "Thugged Out". This was followed up with other notable singles such as "Pieces" featuring Queen Naija and "Bestfriend 4L" featuring Lil Tjay. The singles leading up to Melly's sophomore studio album, Just a Matter of Slime,  like Melly vs. Melvin were released while incarcerated and were put together with pre-recorded vocals prior to his incarceration.

Musical style
YNW Melly has been noted for his melodic vocals and his "mix of bright harmonies slathered in grit and soulful love-sick ballads".

Legal issues

Demons was arrested on October 19, 2015 on three counts of aggravated assault with a deadly weapon and one count of discharging a firearm in public, after firing shots at three people near Vero Beach High School. Demons spent a year in jail before being released on probation.

In 2017, Demons was arrested for violating probation and spent several months in jail before being released in March 2018.

Demons was arrested on June 30, 2018, in Fort Myers, Florida for possession of marijuana, possession of weapon or ammunition by a convicted felon, and drug paraphernalia.

Demons was again arrested on January 3, 2019, in Fort Myers for possession of marijuana.

On February 12, 2019, Demons was charged with two counts of premeditated first-degree murder in connection with the October 2018 shooting deaths in Fort Lauderdale, Florida of two YNW associates described as his close friends, rappers YNW Sakchaser and YNW Juvy. Authorities purport that Demons conspired with fellow YNW rapper Cortlen Henry (YNW Bortlen) to stage the double-murder of Williams (YNW Sakchaser) and Thomas Jr. (YNW Juvy) and make it appear as if they were fatally injured in a drive-by shooting. Henry allegedly drove the victims to the hospital where they later succumbed to their wounds. Demons turned himself in on February 13, 2019. He announced on his Instagram:

On February 22, 2019, Complex reported that Demons and Henry were suspects in the fatal 2017 shooting of off-duty Indian River County Sheriff's Department deputy Garry Chambliss in Gifford.

On November 30, 2021, YNW Melly's trial was set for March 7, 2022. The trial was later delayed and set for May 23, 2022. Delayed again, the trial was pushed back until June 6, 2022. After the trial did not proceed, Demon's team decided to submit a speedy trial request on May 26, 2022. The trial would have to commence in the next 175 days.

On July 6, 2022, it was announced that Demons would no longer face capital punishment if convicted. However, on November 9, 2022, the decision was overruled by an appellate judge, once again making YNW Melly eligible for capital punishment if sentenced.

Personal life 
On April 2, 2020, Demons (via management) told fans on Twitter that he tested positive for COVID-19. He was in the process of trying to get an early release from prison due to health concerns, as 6ix9ine was released from prison due to asthma and bronchitis. On April 14, his motion was denied.

Discography

 Melly vs. Melvin (2019)
 Just a Matter of Slime (2021)

References

External links 

 Official website
  
 
 YNW Melly on Spotify
 

1999 births
Living people
21st-century American rappers
People from Indian River County, Florida
Rappers from Florida
American prisoners and detainees
Bloods
African-American male rappers
Southern hip hop musicians
Gangsta rappers
Vero Beach High School alumni
People charged with murder
Atlantic Records artists
21st-century African-American male singers
American hip hop singers
American contemporary R&B singers
Trap musicians
Singer-songwriters from Florida
African-American male singer-songwriters